MinDStorm, known in Japan as , is an educational video game published and developed by ASK for the Nintendo DS video game console. It was first released in Japan on September 1, 2006, and was released on May 4, 2007 in Europe. MinDStorm was released under the name "Master Jin Jin's IQ Challenge" in North America and was released on October 8, 2007.

Gameplay
When you start playing, you are mostly given four major options:

You can select one among many difficulty modes, and get a sequence of training games according to such difficulty.
You can select a single training game to play.
You can unlock several (non-interactive) games.
You can see your current level in many different areas.

By gaining in-game levels, you gain access to more (non-interactive) games, complete with their solution, to be unlocked later on.

External links
 Official Website

References

505 Games games
2006 video games
Brain training video games
Nintendo DS games
Nintendo DS-only games
Valcon Games games
Video games developed in Japan

Single-player video games